Caroline Lejeune may refer to:

C. A. Lejeune (Caroline A. Lejeune, 1897–1973), English journalist and film critic
Caroline Lejeune (skater) (born 1986), French free-style skater

See also
Lejeune